SS Frank Park was a Liberty ship built in the United States during World War II. She was named after Frank Park, a United States representative from Georgia.

Construction
Frank Park was laid down on 10 June 1944, under a Maritime Commission (MARCOM) contract, MC hull 2367, by J.A. Jones Construction, Brunswick, Georgia; she was sponsored by Mrs. Prince G. Finlayson, and launched on 21 July 1944.

History
She was allocated to the United States Navigation Co., on 31 July 1944. On 8 June 1950, she was laid up in the National Defense Reserve Fleet in Wilmington, North Carolina. On 8 May 1962, she was sold for scrapping to Northern Metals Co., for $47,407. She was removed from the fleet on 17 May 1962.

References

Bibliography

 
 
 
 
 

 

Liberty ships
Ships built in Brunswick, Georgia
1944 ships
Wilmington Reserve Fleet